Hyperoglyphe is a genus of medusafishes native to the Atlantic and Pacific oceans.

Species
There are currently six recognized species in this genus:
 Hyperoglyphe antarctica (Carmichael, 1819) (Bluenose warehou)
 Hyperoglyphe bythites (Ginsburg, 1954) (Black driftfish)
 Hyperoglyphe japonica (Döderlein (de), 1884) (Pacific barrelfish)
 Hyperoglyphe macrophthalma (A. Miranda-Ribeiro, 1915)
 Hyperoglyphe perciformis (Mitchill, 1818) (Barrelfish)
 Hyperoglyphe pringlei (J. L. B. Smith, 1949) (Black butterfish)

References

Centrolophidae
Perciformes genera
Marine fish genera
Taxa named by Albert Günther